For other places with the name see- Korf.

Korf is a village in Larijan-e Sofla Rural District, Larijan District, Amol County, Mazandaran Province, Iran. At the 2006 census, its population was 25, in 9 families.

References 

Populated places in Amol County